Kunovice is a town in the Zlín Region of the Czech Republic.

Kunovice may also refer to:

Kunovice Airport, Zlín Region, Czech Republic
Let Kunovice, a Czech aircraft manufacturer
Kunovice (Vsetín District), a municipality and village in the Zlín Region, Czech Republic
Kuňovice, a municipality and village in the Central Bohemian Region, Czech Republic